Mu Capricorni (μ Cap, μ Capricorni) is a solitary star in the southern constellation of Capricornus. Based upon an annual parallax shift of 37.57 mas as seen from the Earth, the star is located about 87 light years from the Sun. It is visible to the naked eye with an apparent visual magnitude of +5.081.

It is a yellow-white hued, F-type main sequence star with a stellar classification of F2 V. It is an estimated 1.6 billion years old and is spinning with a projected rotational velocity of 69 km/s. The star has 1.29 times the mass of the Sun and around 1.8 times the Sun's radius, with an effective temperature of 6,892 K.

From this Chinese name, the name Kuh has appeared.

References

F-type main-sequence stars
Capricorni, Mu
Capricornus (constellation)
BD-14 6149
Capricorni, 51
Gliese and GJ objects
207958
108036
8351